The Soundboard Series is a live box set recorded and released by the band Deep Purple in 2001.  The set contains six double CDs featuring recordings from six different concerts.  Two of the concerts feature the band's seldom performed Concerto for Group and Orchestra, with Ian Gillan singing Pictured Within.

Personnel
Ian Gillan – lead vocals
Steve Morse – guitar
Roger Glover – bass guitar
Ian Paice – drums, percussion
Jon Lord – organ, keyboards
Additional musicians (Melbourne, Wollongong, Newcastle, Hong Kong)
Greg Maundrell – trumpet
Charles MacInnes – trombone
Paul Williamson – saxophone
Billie Stapleton – backing vocals
Angie Stapleton – backing vocals
Natalie Miller – backing vocals
Additional musicians (Tokyo)
New Japan Select Orchestra conducted by Paul Mann
Big Horns Bee horn section

CD track listing
All songs written by Ian Gillan, Ritchie Blackmore, Roger Glover, Jon Lord and Ian Paice except where noted.

Melbourne 2001

Disc one
"Woman from Tokyo" – 6:41
"Ted the Mechanic" (Gillan, Steve Morse, Glover, Lord, Paice) – 5:10
"Mary Long" – 5:37
"Lazy" – 6:01
"No One Came" – 5:23
"Black Night" – 6:40
"Sometimes I Feel Like Screaming" (Gillan, Morse, Glover, Lord, Paice) – 7:21
"'69" (Gillan, Morse, Glover, Lord, Paice) – 8:53
"Smoke on the Water" – 9:04
"Perfect Strangers" (Gillan, Blackmore, Glover) – 8:42

Disc two
"Hey Cisco" (Gillan, Morse, Glover, Lord, Paice)- 6:28
"When a Blind Man Cries" – 7:27
"Fools" – 10:04
"Speed King" – 16:26
"Hush" (Joe South) – 5:52
"Highway Star" – 7:58
Recorded on 9 March at the Melbourne Rod Laver Arena

Wollongong 2001

Disc one
"Woman from Tokyo" – 6:32
"Ted the Mechanic" (Gillan, Morse, Glover, Lord, Paice) – 5:04
"Mary Long" – 5:20
"Lazy" – 6:07
"No One Came" – 5:49
"Black Night" – 7:23
"Sometimes I Feel Like Screaming" (Gillan, Morse, Glover, Lord, Paice) – 7:47
"Fools" – 10:28
"Perfect Strangers" (Gillan, Blackmore, Glover) – 8:20

Disc two
"Hey Cisco" (Gillan, Morse, Glover, Lord, Paice) – 6:34
"When a Blind Man Cries" – 7:44
"Smoke on the Water" – 10:24
"Speed King" (medley with "Good Times", featuring Jimmy Barnes on vocals) – 15:40
"Hush" (South) – 4:24
"Highway Star" – 7:36
Recorded on 13 March at the Wollongong Entertainment Centre

Newcastle 2001

Disc one
"Woman From Tokyo" – 6:14
"Ted the Mechanic" (Gillan, Morse, Glover, Lord, Paice) – 5:11
"Mary Long" – 5:56
"Lazy" – 6:03
"No One Came" – 5:37
"Black Night" – 7:22
"Sometimes I Feel Like Screaming" (Gillan, Morse, Glover, Lord, Paice) – 7:27
"Fools" – 9:23
"Perfect Strangers" (Gillan, Blackmore, Glover)- 9:30

Disc two
"Hey Cisco" (Gillan, Morse, Glover, Lord, Paice) – 6:19
"When a Blind Man Cries" – 7:26
"Smoke on the Water" – 10:20
"Speed King" (medley with "Good Times", featuring Jimmy Barnes on vocals) – 16:59
"Hush" (South) – 4:18
"Highway Star" – 7:24
Recorded on 14 March at the Newcastle Entertainment Centre

Hong Kong 2001

Disc one
"Woman from Tokyo" – 6:29
"Ted the Mechanic" (Gillan, Morse, Glover, Lord, Paice) – 4:49
"Mary Long" – 5:36
"Lazy" – 6:11
"No One Came" – 5:57
"Black Night" – 8:25
"Sometimes I Feel Like Screaming" (Gillan, Morse, Glover, Lord, Paice) – 7:20
"Fools" – 11:06
"Perfect Strangers" – 10:08

Disc two
"Hey Cisco" (Gillan, Morse, Glover, Lord, Paice) – 6:47
"When a Blind Man Cries" – 7:32
"Smoke on the Water" – 10:11
"Speed King" – 16:14
"Hush" (South) – 4:21
"Highway Star" – 7:33
Recorded on 20 March at Hong Kong Coliseum

Tokyo 24 March 2001

Disc one
"Pictured Within" (Lord) – 11:04
"Sitting in a Dream" (Glover) – 4:45
"Love is All" (Glover, Eddie Hardin) – 4:30
"Fever Dreams" (Ronnie James Dio) – 4:18
"Rainbow in the Dark" (Dio, Vivian Campbell, Jimmy Bain, Vinny Appice) – 5:57
"Watching the Sky" (Gillan, Morse, Glover, Lord, Paice) – 5:27
"Sometimes I Feel Like Screaming" (Gillan, Morse, Glover, Lord, Paice)  – 7:20
"The Well-Dressed Guitar" (Morse) – 4:07
"Wring That Neck" (Blackmore, Nick Simper, Lord, Paice) – 5:09
"Fools" – 9:54
"Perfect Strangers" (Gillan, Blackmore, Glover) – 6:23

Disc two
"Concerto Movement 1" (Lord) – 20:16
"Concerto Movement 2" (Lord) – 18:36
"Concerto Movement 3" (Lord) – 14:45
"When a Blind Man Cries" – 7:34
"Pictures of Home" – 10:06
"Smoke on the Water" – 7:04
Recorded on 24 March in Tokyo
Featuring Ronnie James Dio (vocals) on tracks 2, 3, 4 & 5 (disc one) and track 6 (disc two)

Tokyo 25 March 2001

Disc one
"Pictured Within" (Lord) – 11:24
"Sitting in a Dream" (Glover) – 4:22
"Love is All" (Glover, Hardin) – 4:19
"Fever Dreams" (Dio) – 4:52
"Rainbow in the Dark" (Dio, Campbell, Bain, Appice) – 5:10
"Sometimes I Feel Like Screaming" (Gillan, Morse, Glover, Lord, Paice) – 7:12
"The Well-Dressed Guitar" (Morse) – 3:19
"Wring That Neck" (Blackmore, Simper, Lord, Paice) – 5:58
"When a Blind Man Cries" – 7:42
"Fools" – 10:12
"Perfect Strangers" (Gillan, Blackmore, Glover) – 6:39

Disc two
"Concerto Movement 1" (Lord) – 19:30
"Concerto Movement 2" (Lord) – 19:16
"Concerto Movement 3" (Lord) – 14:44
"Pictures of Home" – 10:28
"Smoke on the Water" – 11:40
Recorded on 25 March in Tokyo
Featuring Ronnie James Dio (vocals) on tracks 2, 3, 4 & 5 (disc one) and track 5 (disc two)

References

2001 live albums
2001 compilation albums
Deep Purple compilation albums
Deep Purple live albums